Vuksanović is a predominantly Serbian surname, a patronymic derived from the given name Vuksan. It may refer to:

Boško Vuksanović (1928–2011), Yugoslav water polo player
Divna M. Vuksanović (born 1965), Serbian philosopher, writer, media theorist
Draginja Vuksanović, Montenegrin politician and University professor
Momčilo Vuksanović (born 1955), Serb NGO activist from Montenegro
Oliver Vuksanović (born 1966), Macedonian lawyer
Sanja Vuksanović (born 1967), Serbian chess player with title of Woman Grandmaster
Slobodan Vuksanović (born 1965), Serbian writer and politician
Sretko Vuksanović (born 1973), Bosnian retired footballer
Vladimir Vuksanović (born 1978), Serbian basketball player
Zoran Vuksanović (born 1972), Montenegrin retired footballer
Žikica Vuksanović (born 1974), Slovenian retired footballer

References

Serbian surnames
Croatian surnames
Patronymic surnames
Surnames from given names